Principal, Ecuador is a small village located at the furthest reaches of the Chordeleg Canton, part of the Azuay Province, that is governed by a local authority named "Gobierno Autónimo Descentralizado" or GAD, that oversees public affairs, the Info Center and internet cafe. The Volcán Fasayña is a massive rock that the town rests beneath which, according to lore, is where the Cañari people originated. The town is known for its traditional Panama hats, artisanal goods, and local organic apples. The Panama hats are, according to the local indigenous people, part of the local indigenous dress and the practice of weaving them has been passed down from generation to generation by the women in the population. Cuenca, the third largest city in Ecuador, is only a two-hour bus ride away.

Culture and tourism

Principal is known for its secluded natural environment and artisanal products. There are a number of hikes and guided tours to natural sites including La Cabaña, El Infiernillo, El Chorro, La Cruz de Misión, La Burra Playa, and Las Tres Lagunas. There is a river that runs through the valley in Principal called the Rio Samba Rancho, with local trout or "troucha."  Nearly all of the fruits, vegetables, and livestock are organic, in which the local population takes pride. They also produce and jar their own local marmalade made from a variety of fruits that is sold in supermarkets in the nearby towns and cities, including Cuenca. 
Each year in April the town hosts a "Festival de las Manzanas" or "Apple Festival" to showcase the fruit from the previous season. The event has many different dishes made from apples and festivities in the center of town at the "Cancha" or court. 

The women of Principal are frequently seen in their traditional indigenous dress weaving hats while they walk down the street and go about their lives. "Cuy", or guinea pig, is a local delicacy in all of Ecuador and is served on special occasions in Principal. 
There are a number of different artisan groups in Principal who weave their products and sell them in a local store as well as a fair trade store in Cuenca.

References

External links
Principal
Lonely Planet

Populated places in Azuay Province